The Nokia X3 Touch and Type also known as Nokia X3-02 is a mobile telephone handset produced by Nokia. This is the first mobile handset released by Nokia that possesses a touchscreen in a "candybar" phone form factor. It is also the first touchscreen handset from Nokia that runs the Series 40 operating system. Previously released touchscreen devices from Nokia have either not had a physical keyboard, or they have had a slide-out, full-QWERTY keyboard. It was introduced on 13 August 2010 as one of the most advanced Series 40 devices in terms of features and specifications.

There is also hardware upgrade version available of this phone, which can be identified from RM-775 and X3-02.5 codes in the sticker which can be found under the battery. The X3-02.5 (RM-775) differences compared to X3-02 (RM-639) are: 1GHz CPU vs 680 MHz CPU, 256 MB ROM vs 128 MB ROM and 128 MB RAM vs 64 MB RAM.

Features 
The key feature of this phone is touch and type. It means that the phone has touch screen and alpha-numeric (12 key) keyboard but no navigation or softkeys. Other main features include: WLAN, HSPA, VoIP with HD Voice, a 5.0-megapixel camera, WebKit Open Source Browser, Flash Lite 3.0, Bluetooth 2.1 + EDR and MIDP Java 2.1 with additional Java APIs. This phone also supports the USB On-the-Go function, which enables the phone to act as a USB Host.

Specification sheet

References

External links
 Nokia X3-02 Touch and Type recenze
 Nokia X3-02 Product page
 Nokia X3-02 Device specification at Forum Nokia

Mobile phones introduced in 2010
X3 Touch and Type
Mobile phones with user-replaceable battery